The Efficiency Medal is a long service award for warrant officers, non-commissioned officers, and other ranks of the New Zealand Territorial Force. It is awarded for 12 years of continuous and efficient service. First awarded in 1931, it was a replacement for the Colonial Auxiliary Forces Long Service Medal, which was first awarded in 1902. New Zealand is one of the few countries that continues to award the Efficiency Medal.

See also 
Efficiency Decoration
Efficiency Medal

References

External links
NZDF Medals - The Efficiency Medal

Military awards and decorations of New Zealand
Long and Meritorious Service Medals of Britain and the Commonwealth